Grey Rabbit may refer to:

Grey Rabbit, an American company that provided intercity bus service
Grey Rabbit (horse), winner of the Prix Ferdinand Dufaure in 1974
Little Grey Rabbit, a character in an English children's book series